Ruth Arnon (Hebrew: רות ארנון [ʁut aʁ'non], born in Tel Aviv on June 1, 1933) is an Israeli biochemist and codeveloper of the multiple sclerosis drug Copaxone. She is currently the Paul Ehrlich Professor of Immunology at the Weizmann Institute of Science, where she is researching anti-cancer and influenza vaccinations.

Biography

Ruth Rosenberg (later Arnon) was born in Tel Aviv, the youngest of three children. Her father, Alexander Rosenberg, moved with the family to Toulouse to pursue degrees in electrical engineering and mathematics. Upon their return to Israel, he worked for the Israel Electric Corporation. Arnon says her interest in science was inspired by her father. She attended Herzliya Hebrew Gymnasium and knew she wanted to be a medical researcher by the age of 15. She studied chemistry at the Hebrew University of Jerusalem before joining the Israel Defense Forces's Atuda academic study program. Arnon earned her M.Sc. degree in 1955 and served for two years as an officer in the IDF. During her time in the military, she married Uriel Arnon, an engineer at the Technion in Haifa.  They have two children: Michal (b. 1957) and Yoram (b. 1961).

Scientific career
Arnon joined the Weizmann Institute of Science in 1960. Upon joining the Institute Arnon began to work on her doctorate under Michael Sela. She has focused most of her life on the field of immunology.  While at Weizmann, Arnon served as the Head of the Department of Chemical Immunology (1975-1978), as the Dean of the Faculty of Biology (1985-1988), Director of the MacArthur Center for Parasitology (1984-1994), Vice President for International Scientific Relations (1995-1997), and as Vice President of the institute (1988-1992). In addition, Professor Arnon served as the Director of the institute's MacArthur Center for Molecular Biology of Tropical Diseases from 1958 to 1994.  Much of Arnon's work has been in the development of vaccinations and cancer research.  One of her largest contributions to science was working alongside Professor Michael Sela to develop a drug for multiple sclerosis called Copaxone. The development of Copaxone began with their successful synthesis of the first synthetic antigen. They, along with Devorah Tietelbaum who was at the time a doctoral student, discovered that a material synthetically produced in the lab could suppress a disease found in animals that is a model for multiple sclerosis. After thirty years of research Copaxone was approved for medical use.

Arnon served as the Chairperson of the Sciences division of the Israel Academy of Sciences from 1995 to 2001.  She later was elected as President of the Israel Academy. She is also a member of the EMBO, the European Molecular Biology Organization.  Arnon served as Secretary-General of the International Union of Immunological Sciences, the President of the European Federation of Immunological Societies, and is also a member of the European Union Research Advisory Board.

Arnon has published more than four hundred articles in biochemistry and immunology.

She was a visiting professor at the Rockefeller Institute (New York), University of Washington (Seattle), University of California (Los Angeles), Pasteur Institute (Paris), Walter and Elise Hall Institute (Melbourne), Imperial Cancer Research Fund (London), and the Curie Institute (Paris).

Copaxone

Arnon and Sela developed a new drug application for the treatment of multiple sclerosis called Copolymer 1.  Its chemical name is glatiramer acetate.  It was submitted by the TEVA Pharmaceutical Company to the FDA for approval, under the name of Copaxone, on June 14, 1995.  Since multiple sclerosis is an immunological disease, Cop 1 is an immunospecific drug, which is no surprise, as Arnon has focused the majority of her work in the field of immunology.  It specifically aids neuroprotection and generation as well as prevents the demyelination of axons, a hallmark of diseases such as multiple sclerosis.  In fact, studies by Arnon et al. have shown an increase in myelination as a result of Cop 1.  In a 2004 article, Arnon and Aharoni state that glatiramer acetate is "highly effective in the suppression of experimental autoimmune encephalomyelitis in various species."

Current Research
Arnon is researching a universal, recombinant influenza vaccination, as well as a cancer vaccine.  A 2009 paper discusses the use of virus-like particles (VLP) to induce an immune response. These particles cannot replicate, but possess the specific antigen-presenting proteins that immune cells use to identify viruses.  Therefore, a vaccine could introduce VLPs to an individual's immune system and bring about the production of memory cells.  Arnon and Ben-Yedidia hypothesize that these vaccines would be effective against H5N1, a pandemic virus more commonly known as bird flu.  They have tested the various synthetic vaccinations on mice and observed a significant immune response.  In addition, they have put human lymphocytes in mice and also observed an immune response.  Their research formed the basis of the company BiondVax, who have taken the universal flu vaccine into human clinical trials.

In 2017 Arnon was appointed co-chair of the UK-Israel Science Council, alongside Prof. Lord Robert Winston. She has been a founding member of the council since 2010.

Summary 
Ruth Rosenberg (later Arnon) was the youngest of three children born in Tel Aviv. [1] Alexander Rosenberg, her father, travelled to Toulouse with his family to pursue degrees in electrical engineering and mathematics. He went to work for the Israel Electric Corporation after they returned to Israel. Her father, according to Arnon, sparked her interest in science. Arnon's work has mostly focused on the creation of vaccines and cancer studies. Working on the development of Copaxone, a medication for multiple sclerosis, with Professor Michael Sela was one of her most significant contributions to science. Copaxone's development began with the successful creation of the first synthetic antigen. They discovered that a substance synthesised in the lab might inhibit a condition observed in animals which is a paradigm for multiple sclerosis, along with Devorah Tietelbaum, who was a doctorate student at the time. Copaxone was licensed for medical use after thirty years of research. Copolymer 1 is a novel medication application created by Arnon and Sela for the treatment of multiple sclerosis. Glatiramer acetate is its chemical name. On June 14, 1995, the TEVA Pharmaceutical Company submitted it to the FDA for approval under the name Copaxone. Cop 1 is an immunospecific medication, which makes sense given that multiple sclerosis is an immunological illness. Arnon has spent the majority of her career working in the field of immunology. It promotes neuroprotection and generation while also preventing axon demyelination, which is a characteristic of illnesses like multiple sclerosis. In fact, research by Arnon et al. have found that Cop 1 causes an increase in myelination. Currently, Arnon is working on a recombinant influenza vaccine that is universal as well as a cancer vaccine. The use of virus-like particles (VLP) to generate an immune response was discussed in a 2009 research. She has won 12 awards and recognitions in her career.

Awards and recognition
 1979 - Robert Koch Prize in Medical Sciences, Germany
 1986 - Jimenez Diaz Award, Spain
 1990 - Elected Member of the Israel Academy of Sciences and Humanities
 1991 - Hadassah Women of Distinction Award
 1994 - Chevalier de l'Ordre de la Légion d'Honneur, France
 1998 - Wolf Prize in Medicine for the development of Cop1, or Copaxone
 1998 - Rothschild Prize in Life Sciences
 2001 - Israel Prize in medicine
 2009 - Elected member of the American Philosophical Society
 2010 - First female president of the Israel Academy of Sciences and Humanities
 2020 - OurCrowd Maimonides Award for Lifetime Achievement in Science, Leadership and Menschlichkeit
 2021 - Honorary Officer of the Order of the British Empire (OBE)

See also
Women of Israel

References

External links
Homepage at the Weizmann Institute

1933 births
Living people
Israeli biochemists
Israeli Jews
Israel Prize in medicine recipients
Israel Prize women recipients
Women biologists
Israeli immunologists
Medical educators
Wolf Prize in Medicine laureates
Academic staff of Weizmann Institute of Science
Members of the Israel Academy of Sciences and Humanities
Jewish chemists
Women inventors
Presidents of the Israel Academy of Sciences and Humanities
Israeli women scientists
Women biochemists
Israeli women physicians
Israeli women chemists
Members of the American Philosophical Society
Honorary Officers of the Order of the British Empire